The 2014–15 Wofford Terriers men's basketball team represented Wofford College during the 2014–15 NCAA Division I men's basketball season. The Terriers, led by 13th year head coach Mike Young, played their home games at the Benjamin Johnson Arena and were members of the Southern Conference. They finished the season 28–7, 16–2 in SoCon play to win the SoCon regular season championship. They defeated UNC Greensboro, Western Carolina, and Furman to be champions of the SoCon tournament. They received an automatic bid to the NCAA tournament where they lost in the second round to Arkansas.

Roster

Schedule

|-
!colspan=9 style="background:#886E4C; color:#000000;"| Regular season

|-
!colspan=9 style="background:#886E4C; color:#000000;"|SoCon tournament

|-
!colspan=9 style="background:#886E4C; color:#000000;"|NCAA tournament

References 

Wofford Terriers men's basketball seasons
Wofford
Wofford
Wolf
Wolf